Visa requirements for Palauan citizens are administrative entry restrictions by the authorities of other states placed on citizens of Palau. As of 2 July 2019, Palauan citizens had visa-free or visa on arrival access to 118 countries and territories, ranking the Palauan passport 50th in terms of travel freedom according to the Henley Passport Index.

Palau signed a mutual visa waiver agreement with Schengen Area countries on 7 December 2015.

Visa requirements map

Visa requirements

Dependent, disputed, or restricted territories
Unrecognised or partially recognised countries

Dependent and autonomous territories

See also
Visa policy of Palau
Palauan passport

References and Notes
References

Notes

Palau
Foreign relations of Palau